Presidential elections were held in Austria on 19 April 1998. The result was a victory for the incumbent, President Thomas Klestil, who sought re-election as an independent candidate. The Austrian People's Party, who had originally put him up in 1992, reluctantly supported him again, while the Austrian Social Democratic Party and the Austrian Freedom Party did not propose any competing candidates. Klestil's competitors were Heide Schmidt, leader of the Liberal Forum, Gertraud Knoll, the former Lutheran superintendent of Burgenland (supported by the Greens), socialite Richard Lugner and Karl Walter Nowak.

Results

By state

References

Austria
President
Presidential elections in Austria
Austria